The Messerschmitt P.1110 (Me P.1110) was a design for a single-seat, high-altitude interceptor, prepared for the German Luftwaffe by the Messerschmitt aircraft manufacturing company, under the Emergency Fighter Program during the last months of World War II.

History
As part of the Emergency Fighter Program, at the beginning of 1945, a programme was launched by the OKL for a new generation of fighter/interceptor aircraft in order to replace the He 162 Volksjäger. The new aircraft was intended to have superior performance, in order to deal with high-altitude threats such as the B-29 Superfortress.

Messerschmitt designed a number of different high-altitude fighter projects which were submitted in February 1945. One of the designs, the Me P.1110 Ente (Duck), had a 40° wing sweep and annular air intakes in front of the wing root (similar to those on the post-war North American YF-93), feeding a single Heinkel HeS 011A jet engine; the annular intakes, while flowing four percent less air, would produce fifteen percent less drag than a single nose intake. The aircraft was to be armed with three MK 108 cannon in the nose, plus perhaps two more in the 40°-swept wings. There was also a proposed butterfly tail variant.

The project would be soon dropped in favor of the other two more conventional designs, but the Junkers EF 128 was chosen as the official winner of the competition and none of the Messerschmitt designs reached the prototype stage. The designs brought forward by other German aircraft makers were the Heinkel P.1078, the Focke-Wulf Ta 183 and the Blohm & Voss P 212.

A further development, the P.1111, with wing root intakes (a concept later adopted by the Republic RF-84F Thunderflash and F-105 Thunderchief) to overcome the power losses and 45° sweep, was prepared in January 1945 but never built.

Variants
The Messerschmitt P.1110 project had at least three different designs, all of which were single-seat fighters with swept wings. Wings were swept back at 40 degrees and included mostly wood in their construction. All of the projected aircraft would be powered by a single Heinkel HeS 011 turbojet.

Me P.1110/I 
Jet-powered interceptor. It was a conventional looking design with the turbojet air intakes located on the fuselage sides. Its armament was three MK 108 cannons located in the nose, as in the following variant.

Me P.1110/II 
A V-tail jet-powered interceptor with a conventional looking design. The air intake of the engine was of an annular shape located behind the cockpit. Like the Me P.1110/I, the Me P.1110/II had 40 degree swept-back wings.

Me P.1110 Ente 
The Me P.1110 "Ente" (Duck) was a more unusual interceptor project with its cockpit located at the nose end of the plane. It had a canard configuration with small wings in the front and larger wings in the rear part of the fuselage. Its air intakes were located on the fuselage sides like in the Me P.1110/I variant. Its armament was four MK 108 cannon.

Specifications (P.1110 as at 12 January 1945)

See also

References

External links

Abandoned military aircraft projects of Germany
World War II fighter aircraft of Germany
P1110
World War II jet aircraft of Germany
1940s German fighter aircraft